Scoparia ergatis is a species of moth in the family Crambidae. It is endemic to New Zealand.

Taxonomy

This species was named by Edward Meyrick in 1884. Meyrick gave a description of the species in 1885. However the placement of this species within the genus Scoparia is in doubt. As a result, this species has also been referred to as Scoparia (s.l.) ergatis.

Description

The wingspan is 13–17 mm. The forewings are light fuscous, thinly and irregularly irrorated with whitish and darker fuscous. The first line is whitish, posteriorly dark-margined. The second line is also whitish, but dark-margined anteriorly. The hindwings are light grey or fuscous-grey, but darker posteriorly. Adults have been recorded on wing in January.

References

Moths described in 1885
Moths of New Zealand
Scorparia
Endemic fauna of New Zealand
Taxa named by Edward Meyrick
Endemic moths of New Zealand